" is the 31st single by Zard, released 1 December 1999 under the B-Gram Records label. This is Zard's first single released in 12 cm CD format. The single opened at #5 rank the first week. It charted for six weeks and sold over 129,000 copies.

Track list
All songs are written by Izumi Sakai.

composer: Yuuichirou Iwai (New Cinema Tokage)/arrangement: Hirohito Furui
the song was used in TV Asahi drama Kasouken no Onna as theme song

composer: Hiroshi Terao/arrangement: Akihito Tokunaga and Furui
(original karaoke) 
(original karaoke) 
 remix

References

1999 singles
Zard songs
1999 songs
Songs written by Izumi Sakai